Fleming House may refer to:

in the United States (by state)
Fleming House, Pasadena, California, one of California Institute of Technology's dormitories
Guy and Margaret Fleming House, San Diego, California, listed on the National Register of Historic Places in San Diego County, California 
Fleming-Hanington House, Denver, Colorado, listed on the National Register of Historic Places in Downtown Denver, Colorado
Fleming House (Smyrna, Delaware), listed on the National Register of Historic Places in New Castle County, Delaware
Thomas W. Fleming House (Flemingsburg, Kentucky), listed on the National Register of Historic Places in Fleming County, Kentucky
Thomas Fleming House (Sherborn, Massachusetts), Sherborn, Massachusetts, listed on the NRHP in Massachusetts
Fleming Hall, Silver City, New Mexico, listed on the National Register of Historic Places in Grant County, New Mexico
James L. Fleming House, Greenville, North Carolina, listed on the National Register of Historic Places in Pitt County, North Carolina
Molly Fleming House, California, Pennsylvania, listed on the National Register of Historic Places in Washington County, Pennsylvania
John M. Fleming Home Place, Collierville, Tennessee, listed on the National Register of Historic Places in Shelby County, Tennessee
Fleming-Welder House, Victoria, Texas, listed on the National Register of Historic Places in Victoria County, Texas
Thomas W. Fleming House (Fairmont, West Virginia), listed on the National Register of Historic Places in Marion County, West Virginia
Fleming-Watson Historic District, Fairmont, West Virginia, listed on the NRHP in West Virginia
David and Lucy Tarr Fleming Mansion, Wellsburg, West Virginia, listed on the National Register of Historic Places in Brooke County, West Virginia

See also
Thomas Fleming House (disambiguation)